= Gonini People's Party =

Political party in Suriname

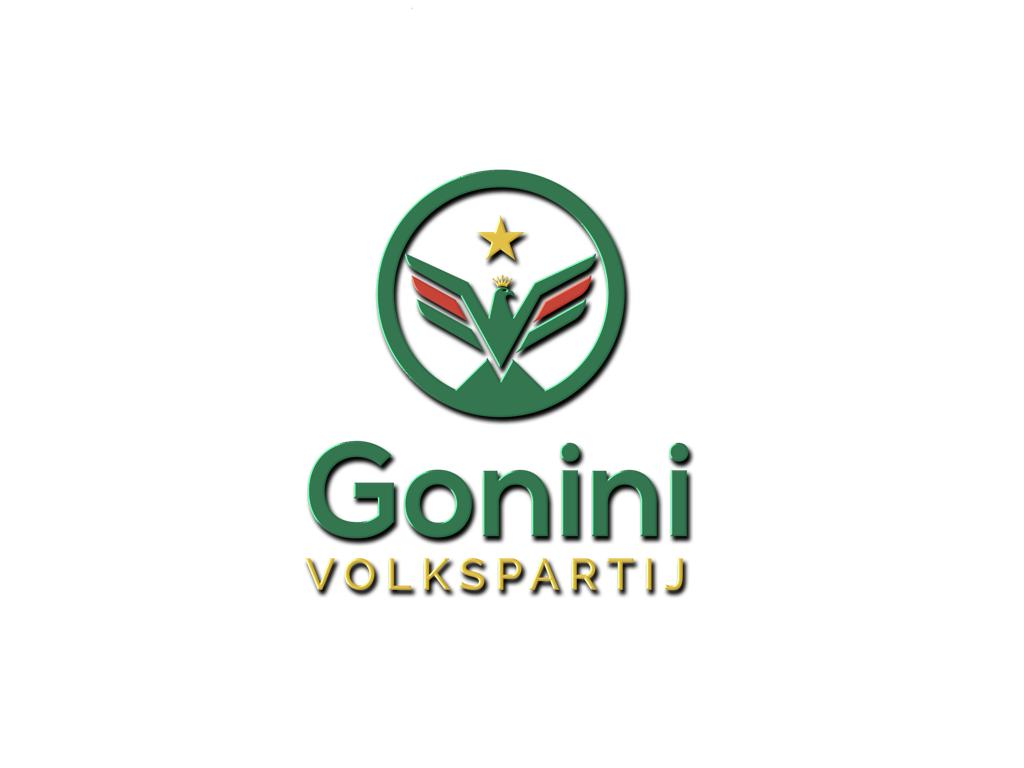
- Abbreviation: GPP
- Chairman: Siegfried Jalink Sr.
- Founded: January 2020
- Headquarters: Suriname
- Ideology: Centrism

Website
- www.goninivolkspartij.com

The Gonini People’s Party is a centre-wing populist political party in Suriname. It was established by Chairman and Party Leader Siegfried Jalink Sr. to contest the upcoming elections constitutionally due in 2025.
